The 1905 South Australian Football Association season was the 29th season of the top-level Australian rules football competition in South Australia.

Ladder

Finals Series

Grand Final

References 

SAFA
South Australian National Football League seasons